Subhasish Dey (Bengali: শুভাশীষ দে; born 1958) is a hydraulician and educator. He is known for his research on the hydrodynamics and acclaimed for his contributions in developing theories and solution methodologies of various problems on hydrodynamics, turbulence, boundary layer, sediment transport and open channel flow. He is currently a professor of the department of civil engineering, Indian Institute of Technology Kharagpur, where he served as the head of the department during 2013–15 and held the position of Brahmaputra Chair Professor during 2009–14 and 2015. He also held the adjunct professor position in the Physics and Applied Mathematics Unit at Indian Statistical Institute Kolkata during 2014–19. Besides he has been named a distinguished visiting professor at the Tsinghua University in Beijing, China.

Dey is an associate editor of Journal of Geophysical Research – Earth Surface, Journal of Hydraulic Engineering, Journal of Hydraulic Research, Sedimentology, Acta Geophysica, Journal of Hydro-Environment Research, International Journal of Sediment Research and Journal of Numerical Mathematics and Stochastics. He is also an editorial board member of several journals including the Proceedings of the Royal Society of London A: Mathematical, Physical and Engineering Sciences.

Brief biography 
Dey was born to Bimalendu Dey (father) and Kana Dey (mother) in Jalpaiguri town, West Bengal, India in 1958. In 1987, he married Swastika Dey (née Talukdar); and they have a son, Sibasish, and a daughter, Sagarika.

Career 
Dey received B.E. degree in civil engineering from the University of North Bengal in 1981, MTech degree in water resources engineering and PhD degree in hydraulic engineering from the Indian Institute of Technology Kharagpur in 1984 and 1992, respectively. He started his professional career as a faculty of the National Institute of Technology, Durgapur, where he taught fluid mechanics and hydraulics from 1984 to 1998. Then, he joined as a faculty of the Indian Institute of Technology Kharagpur in 1998.

Honors 
Dey has become a fellow of the Indian National Science Academy (FNA), Indian Academy of Sciences (FASc), National Academy of Sciences, India (FNASc) and Indian National Academy of Engineering (FNAE). He received the JC Bose Fellowship award in 2018. He is the vice president of the council of World Association for Sedimentation and Erosion Research (WASER) (2019–2022). He served as a Council Member of the World Association for Sedimentation and Erosion Research (WASER) (2011–2013) and the International Association for Hydro-Environment Engineering and Research (IAHR) (2015–2019). He is also a Member of the IAHR Fluvial Hydraulics Committee. Dey is ranked among the 150 most cited researchers in civil engineering in Shanghai’s Global Ranking of Academics. Dey was conferred with the Hans Albert Einstein Award for “his fundamental contribution to the fluvial sediment transport, turbulence mechanism, local scour, and alluvial river dynamics from the perspectives of research, education and practice” from the ASCE in 2022.

Contributions 
He has developed various theories of hydrodynamics. He discovered the origin of the scaling laws of sediment transport and the onset of a straight river to meander. In turbulence, he developed universal probability density function for turbulent velocity fluctuations, Reynolds stress and conditional Reynolds shear stresses in wall-shear flows. In fluvial hydraulics, he has contributed fundamental theories of sediment thresholds (also known as initiation of motion), discovered existence of negative hydrodynamic lift and non-universality of von Kármán constant. He has made pioneering contributions to the mechanism of scour at hydraulic structures. Besides, he has developed theories of secondary boundary layer in curved pipes, wall jets, seeping bed flows and turbulent bursting etc.

Books

References

Further reading 
 E. Padhi, S. Z. Ali and S. Dey (2019). "Mechanics of bed particle saltation in turbulent wall-shear flow". Proceedings of Royal Society A, London, UK, Vol. 475, No. October, pp. 20190318.
 S. Dey, S. Z. Ali and E. Padhi (2019). "Terminal fall velocity: The legacy of Stokes from the perspective of fluvial hydraulics". Proceedings of Royal Society A, London, UK, Vol. 475, No. August, pp. 20190277.
 S. Dey and S. Z. Ali (2019). "Bed sediment entrainment by streamflow: State of the science". Sedimentology, Wiley, Vol. 66, No. 5, 1449–1448. 
 S. Z. Ali and S. Dey (2019). "Hydrodynamics of a weakly curved channel". Physics of Fluids, American Institute of Physics (AIP), Vol. 31, No. 5, pp. 055110.
 E. Padhi, N. Penna, S. Dey and R. Gaudio (2019). "Near-bed turbulence structures in water-worked and screeded gravel-bed flows". Physics of Fluids, American Institute of Physics (AIP), Vol. 31, No. 4, pp. 045107.
 S. Z. Ali and S. Dey (2019). "Bed particle saltation in turbulent wall-shear flow: A review". Proceedings of Royal Society A, London, UK, Vol. 475, No. March, pp. 20180824.
 S. Dey S, G. Ravi Kishore, O. Castro-Orgaz and S. Z. Ali (2019). "Turbulent length scales and anisotropy in submerged turbulent plane offset jets". Journal of Hydraulic Engineering, American Society of Civil Engineers (ASCE), Vol. 145, No. 2, pp. 04018085.
 E. Padhi, N. Penna, S. Dey and R. Gaudio (2018). "Spatially-averaged dissipation rate in flows over water-worked and screeded gravel beds". Physics of Fluids, American Institute of Physics (AIP), Vol. 30, No. 12, pp. 125106.
 E. Padhi, N. Penna, S. Dey and R. Gaudio (2018). "Hydrodynamics of water-worked and screeded gravel beds: A comparative study". Physics of Fluids, American Institute of Physics (AIP), Vol. 30, No. 8, pp. 085105.
 H. Fang, X. Han, G. He and S. Dey (2018). "Influence of permeable beds on hydraulically macro-rough flow". Journal of Fluid Mechanics, Cambridge University Press, UK, Vol. 847, No. July, 552–590.
 S. Dey and S. Z. Ali (2018). "Review Article: Advances in modeling of bed particle entrainment sheared by turbulent flow". Physics of Fluids, American Institute of Physics, Vol. 30, No. 6, pp. 061301.
 S. Z. Ali and S. Dey (2018). "Impact of phenomenological theory of turbulence on pragmatic approach to fluvial hydraulics". Physics of Fluids, American Institute of Physics, Vol. 30, No. 4, pp. 045105.
 S. Z. Ali and S. Dey (2017). "Hydrodynamic instability of a meandering channel". Physics of Fluids, American Institute of Physics, Vol. 29, No. 12, pp. 125107. 
 S. Dey and S. Z. Ali (2017). "Origin of the onset of meandering a straight river". Proceedings of the Royal Society A, London, UK, Vol. 473, No. August, pp. 20170376.
 S. Dey, G. Ravi Kishore, O. Castro-Orgaz and S. Z. Ali (2017). "Hydrodynamics of submerged turbulent plane offset jets". Physics of Fluids, American Institute of Physics, Vol. 29, No. 6, pp. 065112.
 S. Dey and S. Z. Ali (2017). "Stochastic mechanics of loose boundary particle transport in turbulent flow". Physics of Fluids, American Institute of Physics, Vol. 29, No. 5, pp. 055103.
 S. Dey and S. Z. Ali (2017). "Mechanics of sediment transport: Particle scale of entrainment to continuum scale of bedload flux". Journal of Engineering Mechanics, American Society of Civil Engineers (ASCE), Vol. 143, No. 11, pp. 04017127.
 S. Z. Ali and S. Dey (2017). "Origin of the scaling laws of sediment transport". Proceedings of the Royal Society A, London, UK, Vol. 473, Issue 2197, pp. 20160785.
 S. Z. Ali and S. Dey (2016). "Mechanics of advection of suspended particles in turbulent flow". Proceedings of the Royal Society A, London, UK, Vol. 472, Issue, 2195, pp. 20160749.
 S. Z. Ali and S. Dey (2016). "Hydrodynamics of sediment threshold". Physics of Fluids, American Institute of Physics, Vol. 28, No. 7, pp. 075103.
 S. Dey and R. Das (2012). "Gravel-bed hydrodynamics: A double-averaging approach". Journal of Hydraulic Engineering, American Society of Civil Engineers (ASCE), Vol. 138, No. 8, 707–725.
 S. Dey, S. Sarkar and F. Ballio (2011). "Double-averaging turbulence characteristics in seeping rough-bed streams". Journal of Geophysical Research, Earth Surface, American Geophysical Union, Vol. 116, F03020, doi:10.1029/2010JF001832
 S. Dey, T. K. Nath and S. K. Bose (2010). "Submerged wall-jets subjected to injection and suction from the wall". Journal of Fluid Mechanics, Cambridge University Press, UK, Vol. 653, 57–97.
 R. Gaudio, R. Miglio and S. Dey (2010). "Nonuniversality of von Kármán’s κ in fluvial streams". Journal of Hydraulic Research, International Association for Hydraulic Research (IAHR), Vol. 48, No. 5, 658–663.
 S. K. Bose and S. Dey (2010). "Universal probability distributions of turbulence in open channel flows". Journal of Hydraulic Research, International Association for Hydraulic Research (IAHR), Vol. 48, No. 3, 388–394.
 S. K. Bose and S. Dey (2009). "Reynolds averaged theory of turbulent shear flow over undulating beds and formation of sand waves". Physical Review E, The American Physical Society, Vol. 80, 036304.
 S. K. Bose and S. Dey (2007). "Theory of free surface flow over rough seeping beds". Proceedings of the Royal Society A, London, UK, Vol. 463, No. February, 369–383.
 S. Dey and A. Sarkar (2006). "Response of velocity and turbulence in submerged wall jets to abrupt changes from smooth to rough beds and its application to scour downstream of an apron". Journal of Fluid Mechanics, Cambridge University Press, UK, Vol. 556, 387–419.
 S. Dey (2002). "Secondary boundary layer and wall shear for fully developed flow in curved pipes". Proceedings of the Royal Society A, London, UK, Vol. 458, No. February, 283–294.
 S. Dey (1999). "Sediment threshold". Applied Mathematical Modelling, Elsevier, Vol. 23, No. 5, 399–417.
 S. Dey, S. K. Bose and G. L. N. Sastry (1995). "Clear water scour at circular piers: a model". Journal of Hydraulic Engineering, American Society of Civil Engineers (ASCE), Vol. 121, No. 12, 869–876.

External links 
Website

Scientists from West Bengal
Living people
1958 births
Bengali Hindus
Bengali scientists
IIT Kharagpur alumni
20th-century Bengalis
21st-century Bengalis
University of North Bengal alumni
People from Jalpaiguri
Hydraulic engineers
Fluid dynamicists
Indian fluid dynamicists
20th-century Indian educational theorists
20th-century Indian engineers
Fellows of the Indian National Science Academy
Fellows of the Indian Academy of Sciences
Fellows of The National Academy of Sciences, India
Fellows of the Indian National Academy of Engineering
Academic staff of IIT Kharagpur
Academic staff of the Indian Statistical Institute
Academic staff of the National Institute of Technology, Durgapur